The Royal Spanish Tennis Federation (Spanish: Real Federación Española de Tenis, RFET) is the national governing body of tennis in Spain. As of 2020, the federation has 1,128 registered clubs and 70,151 federated tennis players.

The Royal Spanish Tennis Federation is a member of the regional association Tennis Europe and the International Tennis Federation (ITF).

The organisation is responsible for the Spanish Davis Cup team and the Spanish Fed Cup team.

Federation headquarters is in Barcelona, at the emblematic building of the old restaurant of the Font del Gat, created by the architect Puig i Cadafalch in 1918.

In 2008, the Spanish postal service, Correos, released a postage stamp commemorating the centennial of the RFET.

References

Spain
Tennis in Spain
Tennis
Organisations based in Spain with royal patronage
1909 establishments in Spain